Augustus A. White III (born June 4, 1936) is the Ellen and Melvin Gordon Distinguished Professor of Medical Education and Professor of Orthopedic Surgery at Harvard Medical School and a former Orthopaedic Surgeon-in-Chief at Beth Israel Hospital, Boston, Massachusetts. White was the first African American medical student at Stanford, surgical resident at Yale University, professor of medicine at Yale, and department head at a Harvard-affiliated hospital (Beth Israel Hospital).

Biography
White was born on June 4, 1936 in Memphis, Tennessee to his father, Augustus A. White Jr., and mother Vivian White. When he was eight, his father, a doctor, died unexpectedly. White and his mother moved in with an aunt and uncle. At thirteen, White left Tennessee to attend Northfield Mount Hermon School in Mount Hermon, Massachusetts. Upon graduation, White enrolled at Brown University, earning a B.A. in psychology and varsity letters in football and lacrosse. He then attended Stanford University Medical School, serving as student body President and graduating in 1961.

After graduating from medical school, White served as an intern at the University of Michigan Medical Center, a general surgery resident at Presbyterian Medical Center, San Francisco, CA, and an orthopedic resident at Yale Medical Center.

Following his military service, White earned a Ph.D. in biomechanics from the Karolinska Institute in Stockholm, Sweden. Upon returning to the United States and to Yale University, White was appointed Assistant Professor of Orthopedic Surgery (1969-1972), Associate Professor of Orthopedic Surgery (1972-1976), and Professor of Orthopedic Surgery (1977-1978). White was recruited to Beth Israel Hospital in 1978 as Orthpaedic Surgeon-in-Chief, serving in that position until 1991. At Beth Israel, he also served as Chief of the Spine Surgery Division (1991-1992) and Director of the Daniel E. Hogan Spine Fellowship Program (1983-2003). While at Beth Israel, White was Professor of Orthopaedic Surgery (1978-) and Ellen and Melvin Gordon Professor of Medical Education (2001-) at Harvard Medical School and Professor of Orthopaedic Surgery (1978-), Harvard-MIT Division of Health Sciences and Technology.

Honors 
White was a Brown University Alumni Trustee, served on the Board of Fellows from 1981 to 1992, and as member of the Committee on Medical Education (1991-1996). He was the President and co-founder of the J. Robert Gladden Society, whose mission “is to increase diversity within the orthopaedic profession and promote the highest quality musculoskeletal care for all people.” In 1989, White was appointed President of the University of Maryland at Baltimore, though he resigned a few weeks later before formally taking office, after a dispute with the Board of Regents. In 1996, White served as Chairman of the Diversity Committee of the American Academy of Orthopaedic Surgeons. He authored the textbook Clinical Biomechanics of the Spine and the book for patients Your Aching Back. Since retiring from surgery in 2001, White has researched and written about issues of diversity and cultural sensitivity in medicine. While studying in Sweden, White met his wife, Anita. They have three children.

Works or publications
 Clinical Biomechanics of the Spine (1978)
 Your Aching Back (1990)
 Seeing Patients (2011)

References

External links
 An interview with Augustus White hosted by Tavis Smiley.
 An oral history with Augustus White.
 The Augustus A. White papers, The Center for the History of Medicine at the Countway Library, Harvard Medical School.

1936 births
Living people
Brown Bears football players
Brown Bears men's lacrosse players
Stanford University School of Medicine alumni
Karolinska Institute alumni
Yale School of Medicine faculty
Harvard Medical School faculty
People from Memphis, Tennessee
Northfield Mount Hermon School alumni